Dewitt H. Parker (1885–1949) was a professor of philosophy at the University of Michigan. Appointed department chair in 1929, Parker published works on metaphysics, aesthetics, and ethics.

Publications

Books
 (1917) The Self and Nature 
 (1920) The Principles of Aesthetics (available in the public domain)
 (1926) The Analysis of Art 
 (1931) Human Values 
 (1941) Experience and Substance 
 (1957) The Philosophy of Value (with William Frankena)

Journal articles
(1950) Is There a Third Kind of Knowledge? Philosophical Review 59 (2):221-229.
(1946) Rejoinder to Mr. Lepley, Philosophical Review 55 (3):288-291.
(1945) Esse Est Percipi, with Particular Reference to Number, Journal of Philosophy 42 (11):281-291.
(1945) Knowledge by Acquaintance, Philosophical Review 54 (1):1-18.
(1945) Knowledge by Description, Philosophical Review 54 (5):458-488.
(1944) Some Comments on "Reformed Materialism and Intrinsic Endurance" Philosophical Review 53 (4):383-391.
(1938) Value and Existence Ethics 48 (4):475-486.
(1934) Reflexive Relations: A Rejoinder. Philosophical Review 43 (3):295-300.
(1934) The Metaphysics of Value I International Journal of Ethics 44 (3):293-312.
(1933) Reflexive Relations, Philosophical Review 42 (3):303-311.
(1932) A Symposium: The Aim and Content of Graduate Training in Ethics, with George P. Adams, C. J. Ducasse, Walter Goodnow Everett, DeWitt Parker, F.C. Sharp & J.H. Turfs, International Journal of Ethics 43 (1):53-64.
(1929) On the Notion of Value,  Philosophical Review 38 (4):303-325.
(1928) Alfred Henry Lloyd, 1864-1927 with Arthur Lyon Cross & R.M. Wenley, Journal of Philosophy 25 (5):124-130.
(1910) Knowledge and Volition, Journal of Philosophy, Psychology and Scientific Methods 7 (22):594-602.

References

External links

 University of Michigan Faculty History - Memorial page

Philosophers of art
University of Michigan faculty
20th-century American philosophers
American ethicists
Metaphysicians
1885 births
1949 deaths